The United States Air Force's 291st Combat Communications Squadron is an Air National Guard combat communications unit located at Keaukaha Military Reservation in Hilo, Hawaii.

Mission
The 291st Combat Communication Squadron (291st CBCS) Employs tactical cyber operations for combat enablement. Installs computer and telephone networks, high frequency radio systems, and administers network security operations.

History
The 291st Combat Communications Squadron was activated into federal service 6 March 1967 at Hickam Air Force Base, Oahu, Hawaii. The organization relocated to temporary World War II vintage quarters on the Island of Hawaii in March 1976. In October 1982, the unit moved to its current facilities. The squadron is one of seven subordinate units of the 154th Mission Support Group headquartered at Joint Base Pearl Harbor-Hickam, Oahu, Hawaii.

Assignments

Major Command/Gaining Command

Air Force Space Command (2009 – present)
Pacific Air Forces (1967–2009)

Wing/Group
154th Wing

Bases stationed
Keaukaha Military Reservation, Hilo, Hawaii (1976 – present)
Hickam Air Force Base, Oahu, Hawaii (1967–1976)

Commanders
Lieutenant Colonel Thomas E. Naldrett (2022-Present)
Lieutenant Colonel Heather M.C. Leite (2017–2022)
Lieutenant Colonel Garrick H. Yokoe (2010 – 2017)
Major Johnny Mah (2005–2009)
Lieutenant Colonel Roy A. Cornella (1992–2005)
Lieutenant Colonel Richard Nishimura (1990–1992)
Lieutenant Colonel William Wright (1984–1990)
Major Richard Nishimura (1981–1984)
Lieutenant Colonel David Howard (?–1981)

References

External links

Squadrons of the United States Air National Guard
Military units and formations in Hawaii
Communications squadrons of the United States Air Force